Mohand Muhammed Fayiz al-Shehri (also transliterated as Alshehri) (May 7, 1979 – September 11, 2001) was one of five terrorist hijackers aboard United Airlines Flight 175 as part of the September 11 attacks. Despite his name, he was not related to the brothers Wail al-Shehri or Waleed al-Shehri who were part of the team that hijacked American Airlines Flight 11.

A Saudi, al-Shehri was a former college student who dropped out after failing his courses. He later left his home to fight in Chechnya in 2000, but was probably diverted to Al-Qaeda training camps in Afghanistan. It was during that time that he would be chosen to take part in the attacks in America. He received a U.S. student visa in October 2000.

al-Shehri arrived in the United States in May 2001. On September 11, 2001, al-Shehri boarded United Airlines Flight 175 and assisted in its hijacking so that it could be flown into the South Tower of the World Trade Center.

History 

Born 1979, al-Shehri was one of five hijackers to come from the 'Asir province of Saudi Arabia, the others being Ahmed al-Nami, Abdulaziz al-Omari and Waleed and Wail al-Shehri, two brothers with whom he shared the same tribe, Bani Shehr, although they were not related to him.

According to Arab News, Mohand al-Shehri went to fight in Chechnya in early 2000, where he may have met Hamza al-Ghamdi. On October 23, al-Shehri applied for a US B-1/B-2 visa in Jeddah. Other than an error on his school's address the application was not suspicious and he was not interviewed before being granted the visa.

Al-Ghamdi and al-Shehri flew together from Iran into Kuwait that October. Three months later the pair rented a post office box in Delray Beach, Florida, where someone with the same name signed up to use the public library's computers. According to FBI director Robert Mueller and the 9/11 Commission, however, al-Shehri did not first enter the United States until a London or Dubai flight on May 28 with al-Ghamdi and Abdulaziz al-Omari.

He was one of nine hijackers to open a SunTrust bank account with a cash deposit around June 2001, and on July 2 gained a Florida State ID Card.

Al-Shehri occasionally trained on simulators at the FlightSafety Aviation School in Vero Beach, Florida together with Abdulaziz al-Omari and Saeed al-Ghamdi.

Attacks 

Fayez Banihammad purchased both his and al-Shehri's one-way first class tickets for United Airlines Flight 175 online on August 27 or 29, charging the $4,464.50 to a Visa card from Mustafa al Hawsawi, listing their addresses both as a Mail Boxes Etc. in Delray Beach. This was not the same postal box used by Hamza and Ahmed al-Ghamdi, who purchased their tickets for the same flight a day later, with another Mailboxes Etc. postal box in Delray Beach, although both groups listed the same phone number.

On September 7, he flew from Fort Lauderdale to Newark, New Jersey with Hamza al-Ghamdi on $139.75 tickets purchased from the Mile High Travel agency in Lauderdale-by-the-Sea.

On September 10, 2001, he shared a room at the Milner Hotel in Boston, Massachusetts with three other terrorists: Fayez Banihammad, Marwan al-Shehhi, who would pilot Flight 175 into the South Tower of the World Trade Center, and Satam al-Suqami, a hijacker of Flight 11.

On September 11, al-Shehri boarded Flight 175 and sat in first class seat 2B, next to Banihammad in 2A. About a half an hour into the flight, the plane was hijacked. It is believed that Banihammad and al-Shehri forcibly entered the cockpit and murdered the pilots while the al-Ghamdi brothers forced the remaining crew and passengers towards the rear of the aircraft, allowing al-Shehhi to take control of the plane. At 9:03 a.m., around 20 minutes after the hijacking began, al-Shehhi flew the plane into the South Tower of the World Trade Center, killing all on board and killing or trapping hundreds of people inside the building. 56 minutes after the crash, at 9:59 a.m., the South Tower collapsed, killing all who were trapped and many more on the ground.

See also 
 Hijackers in the September 11 attacks
 PENTTBOM

References

External links 

 The Final 9/11 Commission Report

United Airlines Flight 175
2001 deaths
Participants in the September 11 attacks
Saudi Arabian al-Qaeda members
1979 births
Saudi Arabian mass murderers
Saudi Arabian murderers of children
People from 'Asir Province